All Saints Church of England Academy (formerly All Saints Church of England School) is a coeducational secondary school located in Wyke Regis in the English county of Dorset.

It is a Church of England school within the Diocese of Salisbury. Previously a voluntary aided school administered by Dorset Council, in June 2019 All Saints Church of England School converted to academy status and was renamed All Saints Church of England Academy. The school is now sponsored by the Ambitions Academy Trust.

All Saints Church of England Academy offers GCSEs and BTECs as programmes of study for pupils. The school also offers a range of extra-curricular activities including the Duke of Edinburgh's Award.

References

External links
All Saints Church of England Academy official website

Secondary schools in Dorset
Church of England secondary schools in the Diocese of Salisbury
Academies in Dorset